Jose Pedro Santos (born September 6, 1976), known as Pedrinho is a former Brazilian football player.

Club statistics

References

External links

Kawasaki Frontale

1976 births
Living people
Brazilian footballers
J1 League players
Kawasaki Frontale players
Brazilian expatriate footballers
Expatriate footballers in Japan
People from Campos dos Goytacazes
Association football midfielders
Sportspeople from Rio de Janeiro (state)